Sanctuary is a re-mixable science fiction film. In 2005, it became the first production to sign professional union actors to Creative Commons licensing terms. It is a superhero origin story set in Head Bin, a fictional universe created by MOD Films for their re-mixable movie experiment. “Sanctuary” is also a pilot for a multi-player feature film and an open interactive story format, the RIG, being developed by MOD Films in London.

The film was completed in 2009. Most production assets, including principal photography shot on 35mm film and digitized, have been cleared for free-for-non-commercial use.

Reception and awards 
Sydney Film Festival Innovation Award (2009)
Creative Commons article (July 2006)
ABC Radio  (May 2004)
Sydney Morning Herald (April 2004)
Slashdot (March 2004)
The Guardian article (June 2004)
NESTA Inventions award for Sanctuary (May 2004)

References

External links 

Sanctuary "Beta band" community site on Multiply
Sanctuary assets on Flickr

Creative Commons-licensed science fiction films
British science fiction short films